I Camaleonti ("The Chameleons") are an Italian pop group from Milan, mostly active between the late 1960s and the early 1970s.

Background 
I Camaleonti were formed in 1963 in Milan. The original line-up included Livio Macchia (guitar), Antonino Cripezzi (keyboards), Paolo de Ceglie (drums) and Gerardo Manzoli (bass). In 1965 the band's line-up was augmented with the arrival of Riki Maiocchi on vocals and guitar. The band's first hit was a cover of the Small Faces' "Sha-La-La-La-Lee", and coincided with the popularity of the beat genre. 

In 1966, vocalist and guitarist Riki Maiocchi left the group to pursue a solo career and was replaced by Mario Lavezzi. With Lavezzi on board, the group gradually began to switch to a more melodic pop sound, soon achieving success with a modern rendition of a popular 1935 tune penned by Cesare Andrea Bixio and Michele Galdieri, "Portami tante rose". 

Between 1968 and 1973 I Camaleonti had four singles topping the Italian charts, including "Applausi", "Io per lei" and "L'ora dell'amore". Between 1970 and 1993 they entered the Sanremo Music Festival five times, (the last time along with Dik Dik and Equipe 84's lead singer Maurizio Vandelli), finishing third in 1979 with "Quell'attimo in più". Despite numerous line-up changes, the band is still active to these days.

Members

Current members 
 Livio Macchia: vocals, guitar (1963–present)
 Valerio Veronese: guitar, vocals (1985–present)
 Massimo Brunetti: keyboards, flute (1990–present)
 Massimo di Rocco: drums (2004–present)
 Matteo Arosio: Tibetan bell (2006–present)

Past members 
 Paolo de Ceglie: drums (1963–2004, d. in 2004)
 Gerardo "Gerry" Manzoli: bass (1963–1982)
 Riki Maiocchi: vocals, guitar (1965–1966)
 Mario Lavezzi: vocals, guitar (1966–1968)
 Gabriele Lorenzi: keyboards (1967–1968)
 Dave Sumner: guitar (1973–1980)
 Vincenzo Mancuso: guitar, flute (1981–1984)
 Antonio "Tonino" Cripezzi: vocals, keyboards (1963–2022, d. in 2022)

Discography

Studio albums
     1966 – The Best Records in The World  
     1967 – Portami tante rose
     1968 – Io per lei
     1969 – Vita d'uomo (EP)
     1973 – I magnifici Camaleonti 
     1974 – Amicizia e amore
     1975 – Piccola Venere ed altri successi
     1976 – Che aereo stupendo… la speranza
     1977 – In vendita
     1979 – ...e camminiamo 
     1993 – Come passa il tempo e i più grandi successi 
     1996 – Libero 
     1997 – Applausi ed altri successi
     2001 – 2001 ed oltre
     2004 – 40 anni di musica e applausi  
     2006 – Storia 
     2010 – Camaleonti Live

References

External links
 

 

Musical groups established in 1962
Italian pop music groups
1962 establishments in Italy
Musical groups from Milan